A fly sheet may refer to a lightweight pamphlet or handout, such as a Flyer (pamphlet). It also may refer to:

A lightweight Horse blanket used to deter insects
Fly (tent),  the outer lining of a tent or stand-alone material shelter without walls
The Fly Sheets, pamphlets published in the late 1840s associated with Samuel Dunn and others who advocated for reform in the Wesleyan Methodist tradition

See also
Fly (disambiguation)